The Green Line is a  light rail line in Dallas, United States, operated by the Dallas Area Rapid Transit authority (DART). The US$1.7 billion project opened in phases, starting in 2009.

Route
The southern terminus of the line is currently at Buckner in southeast Dallas near Buckner Boulevard.  The line runs northwest to Fair Park Deep Ellum, before turning west and running through downtown Dallas.  After leaving West End station, the line turns north, running parallel to Interstate 35 past the American Airlines Center.  The line then heads northwest, providing service to Southwestern Medical Center, Love Field, and the cities of Farmers Branch and Carrollton, terminating at North Carrollton/Frankford station in Carrollton. Much of the northern end of the line runs in the right of way of the former Missouri–Kansas–Texas Railroad (which was established by the Dallas and Wichita Railroad).

Trinity Mills Station, near the northern terminus, provides a connection with the A-train line run by the Denton County Transportation Authority (DCTA). This line connects Denton to Carrollton, with stops in Lewisville and Highland Village.  The commuter train may stop in other Denton County cities, should they choose to join the DCTA.

History

Construction
On February 9, 2007, a trench collapsed during construction on the line killing one construction worker.
On March 12, 2007, the City of Dallas officials and DART made an agreement to make Burbank Station (formerly Love Field Station) a surface-level facility after a long debate of whether or not to make it an underground station.
Two bridges in that area were removed and roads were lowered to street level.
On June 8, 2009, full-speed tests of the Green Line were conducted successfully with local officials and members of the media aboard.  The route of the test included the four stations, then still under construction, that joined the DART light rail system in September 2009.

Opening
The Green Line began operation on September 14, 2009, with a route from downtown Dallas southeast to Fair Park; this short route was scheduled to open in time to service the 2009 State Fair of Texas. On December 6, 2010 the line extended further to Pleasant Grove, as well as continuing northwest from Victory Station to Farmers Branch and Carrollton; both extensions, completing the Green Line.

Future plans
The D2 Subway is planned to be implemented in 2028 and will reroute the Green Line's western terminus over the former Blue Line's tracks to terminate at UNT Dallas Station.

Stations

Daily Service
Listed from east to west and south to north

References

External links 

 Full DART System Map
 DART Expansion Plans
 Denton County Transportation Authority

Dallas Area Rapid Transit light rail lines
Passenger rail transportation in Texas
Transportation in the Dallas–Fort Worth metroplex